Joseph Ferdinand Martial Asselin,  (February 3, 1924 – January 25, 2013) was a Canadian politician and the 25th Lieutenant Governor of Quebec (1990–1996).

Life and career
Born in La Malbaie, Quebec, the son of Ferdinand Asselin and Eugénie Tremblay, he was called to the Bar of Quebec in 1951. He became a Queen's Counsel in 1967. From 1957 to 1963, he was the mayor of La Malbaie.

Asselin was first elected to the House of Commons of Canada in the 1958 election as a Progressive Conservative Member of Parliament in the Diefenbaker sweep. He represented the riding of Charlevoix.

Asselin was defeated in the 1962 election. Despite no longer having a seat, Diefenbaker appointed Asselin to the position of Minister of Forestry in 1963, in the hope that he and the Tories would both win the upcoming 1963 election. He served for only a month until the defeat of the Conservatives and Asselin's failure to regain his seat.

He returned to the House of Commons in the 1965 election, and he was re-elected in the 1968 election.

Prior to the 1972 election, he accepted an appointment to the Senate of Canada. He sat in the Senate until 1990, when he was appointed as lieutenant governor by the Governor General, on the advice of Prime Minister Brian Mulroney. Asselin was in office during the 1995 Quebec Referendum for sovereignty. In 1996, he was made an officer of the Order of Canada.

In 1992, he was given the right to use the honorific style of "The Right Honourable", which is granted for life and to very few eminent Canadians.{{[cn}} On January 25, 2013, Asselin died at the Hôpital de l'Enfant-Jésus de Québec in Quebec City. He was 88 years old.

Coat of arms

References

 
 Biography at the official National Assembly of Quebec website

External links
 

1924 births
2013 deaths
Lieutenant Governors of Quebec
Members of the 18th Canadian Ministry
Members of the 21st Canadian Ministry
Members of the King's Privy Council for Canada
Progressive Conservative Party of Canada MPs
Progressive Conservative Party of Canada senators
Members of the House of Commons of Canada from Quebec
Canadian senators from Quebec
Officers of the Order of Canada
Mayors of places in Quebec
Lawyers in Quebec
Canadian King's Counsel
People from Capitale-Nationale
Université Laval alumni
La Malbaie